Gerald John Villiers Weigall (19 October 1870 – 17 May 1944) was an English cricketer.

Family
Born in Wimbledon, Weigall was the son of a Victorian artist, Henry Weigall (best known for his portrait of Benjamin Disraeli in 1878–1879), and his wife, the writer Lady Rose Sophia Mary Fane. Through his mother, he was connected to several powerful aristocratic dynasties including the Duke of Wellington. A younger brother was Lieutenant-Colonel Sir William Ernest George Archibald Weigall, 1st Baronet, KCMG, a Conservative MP who was Governor of South Australia. Two other brothers, Louis and Evelyn, were also first-class cricketers.

He married, in 1897, Josephine Harrison, and they had issue.

Career
Gerry Weigall was educated at Wellington College, Berkshire, before going up to Emmanuel College, Cambridge, in 1889. He made his first-class debut for Kent County Cricket Club as an opening batsman against Marylebone Cricket Club (MCC) in 1891; scoring a half-century in the second innings, before achieving his Cambridge blue later in the season. An all-round sportsman, he also represented Cambridge in rackets, and popularised squash — a sport he played into his seventies.

A defensive batsman with a strong cut shot, he often batted down the order after leaving Cambridge and often added useful runs, including his highest first-class score of 138 not out which helped Kent to victory over the Gentlemen of Philadelphia in 1897.

Following his playing career, Weigall became a coach, coaching young players from Kent's Tonbridge Nursery and the second eleven. He is credited with the discovery of Les Ames; who went on to play in 47 Test matches for England. He also coached Yorkshire's colts side for a time. As a coach, he was noted as a "stickler for orthodox batting", and would demonstrate a perfect technique with items ranging from borrowed bats to umbrellas.

He was a great character. According to E.W. Swanton, "He always had a few pet bees buzzing around in his bonnet, and used to inveigh against the criminal folly of selectors and authority generally if their view did not match his own." When Maurice Leyland was preferred to Frank Woolley in the touring party to Australia in 1928–29, he fulminated against the selection of a "cross-batted village-greener". When he scored 63 not out in the 1892 University Match, three of the best Cambridge batsmen were run out during his innings, including no less a figure than F.S. Jackson, his captain. When it appeared that one of them would have to go, Weigall is supposed to have sacrificed his partner by calling: "Get back, Jacker. I'm set." Swanton sums him up thus: "... he may well sound a rather preposterous fellow... I can only say that every cricketer was his friend, and that he never spoke an unkind word about anyone."

He died in a Dublin Hospital on 17 May 1944, "troubled by illness from the outbreak of war".

References

External links
 

1870 births
1944 deaths
English cricketers
Kent cricketers
Cambridge University cricketers
Marylebone Cricket Club cricketers
Europeans cricketers
East of England cricketers
Gentlemen cricketers
Non-international England cricketers
English cricket coaches
People from Wimbledon, London
Alumni of Emmanuel College, Cambridge
English racquets players
English male squash players
Gentlemen of England cricketers
Oxford and Cambridge Universities cricketers
English cricketers of 1919 to 1945
H. D. G. Leveson Gower's XI cricketers
C. I. Thornton's XI cricketers
L. H. Tennyson's XI cricket team
A. J. Webbe's XI cricketers